The 1986 Missouri Tigers football team was an American football team that represented the University of Missouri in the Big Eight Conference (Big 8) during the 1986 NCAA Division I-A football season. The team compiled a 3–8 record (2–5 against Big 8 opponents), finished in sixth place in the Big 8, and was outscored by opponents by a combined total of 314 to 196. Woody Widenhofer was the head coach for the second of four seasons. The team played its home games at Faurot Field in Columbia, Missouri.

The team's statistical leaders included Darrell Wallace with 872 rushing yards, Ronnie Cameron with 654 passing yards, and Robert Delpino with 299 receiving yards.

Schedule

References

Missouri
Missouri Tigers football seasons
Missouri Tigers football